Hannes F. Wagner is a German economist. He is currently associate professor of finance at Bocconi University.

Education
PhD in finance and MSc from The Ludwig Maximilian University of Munich 
BS in business economics from Ludwig Maximilian University of Munich

References

External links 
 

Year of birth missing (living people)
Living people
German economists
Academic staff of Bocconi University
Ludwig Maximilian University of Munich alumni
Place of birth missing (living people)